Emma Grant (born 22 July 1989) is a retired Australian rules footballer who played for Collingwood in the AFL Women's (AFLW).

Early life and state football
Grant grew up in Gisborne and played her junior football at Gisborne from under-9s to under-12s, being the first girl to play at the club. At the age of 12 she had to stop playing football due to league rules and switched to netball. After moving to Bendigo for her university studies, she joined VWFL club Bendigo Thunder in 2011 as a foundation player. She captained them in the 2016 season, when they were unbeaten until losing the premier division grand final to Deer Park, and won the best and fairest award by 10 votes. During the season she also represented  in two exhibition matches.

During the off-season between the 2017 and 2018 AFLW seasons, Grant played for Diamond Creek in the VFLW, helping them to the grand final, but they lost the premiership match to Darebin Falcons.

AFL Women's career
After being drafted by Collingwood, Grant impressed in a practice match 10 point win over the Western Bulldogs, playing each quarter in a different position. She made her debut in round 1, 2017, in the inaugural AFLW match at IKON Park against Carlton, in which she left the field in the second quarter after Brianna Davey's arm hit her in a tackle. She did not return to the field after failing a concussion test.

After playing all 7 matches in the inaugural season and placing 4th in the best and fairest, Collingwood re-signed Grant for the 2018 season during the trade period in May 2017.

Collingwood re-signed Grant for the 2019 season during the trade period in June 2018.

In March 2020, following the 2020 season in which she didn't play due to a head concussion she got in pre-season, Grant announced her retirement.

Personal life
Apart from her sports career, Grant worked as a PE and Grade 1-2 teacher at Bendigo Violet Street Primary School and then at Moonee Ponds Primary School.
Currently Grant is teaching PE at Bendigo South East College.

Statistics
Statistics are correct to the end of the 2020 season.

|- style="background-color: #eaeaea"
! scope="row" style="text-align:center" | 2017
|style="text-align:center;"|
| 5 || 7 || 1 || 0 || 35 || 10 || 45 || 17 || 23 || 0.1 || 0.0 || 5.0 || 1.4 || 6.4 || 2.4 || 3.3
|- 
! scope="row" style="text-align:center" | 2018
|style="text-align:center;"|
| 5 || 7 || 0 || 0 || 43 || 19 || 62 || 17 || 18 || 0.0 || 0.0 || 6.1 || 2.7 || 8.9 || 2.4 || 2.6
|- style="background-color: #eaeaea"
! scope="row" style="text-align:center" | 2019
|style="text-align:center;"|
| 5 || 6 || 1 || 0 || 25 || 17 || 42 || 9 || 12 || 0.2 || 0.0 || 4.2 || 2.8 || 7.0 || 1.5 || 2.0
|- 
! scope="row" style="text-align:center" | 2020
|style="text-align:center;"|
| 5 || 0 || — || — || — || — || — || — || — || — || — || — || — || — || — || —
|- class="sortbottom"
! colspan=3| Career
! 20
! 2
! 0
! 103
! 46
! 149
! 43
! 53
! 0.1
! 0.0
! 5.2
! 2.3
! 7.5
! 2.2
! 2.7
|}

References

External links

 

Living people
1989 births
Collingwood Football Club (AFLW) players
People from Gisborne, Victoria
Australian rules footballers from Victoria (Australia)
Sportswomen from Victoria (Australia)
Australian schoolteachers
Victorian Women's Football League players